Carolina Nabuco, born Maria Carolina Nabuco de Araújo (February 9, 1890 – August 18, 1981), was a Brazilian writer and translator.

In 1978, Carolina received the Machado de Assis Award, from the Brazilian Academy of Letters, for her work as a whole.

Life 
Carolina was born in the city of Rio de Janeiro, in 1890. She was the daughter of Evelina Torres Ribeiro Nabuco and Joaquim Nabuco, writer, diplomat and general deputy of the Empire of Brazil, co-founder of the Brazilian Academy of Letters She spent her childhood in Petrópolis, and her adolescence in the United States, where her father was an ambassador for Brazil.

In 1928, she published her first book, the biography of her father, Joaquim Nabuco, awarded with the Essay Prize of the Brazilian Academy of Letters. She worked as a translator and writer.

A Sucessora and Rebecca 
In 1934 she published the novel A Sucessora. The novel was involved in a controversy scandal, after the release of Daphne du Maurier's novel Rebecca, dealing with the latter's supposed plagiarism of Nabuco's book. Nabuco was accused of plagiarizing the novel Encarnação by Brazilian author José de Alencar, when she wrote A Sucessora.

According to Nabuco herself in the pages of her memoir Oito décadas (Eight Decades), she translated A Sucessora into English hoping to see it published in the United States, and sent it to a New York literary agency, with the request that she also make contact with agents in England.  As soon as she read Rebecca, she wrote to the New York agent asking about the English contact, but the answer was that he had found none. Following the film's release, the New York Times Book Review published an article highlighting the similarities between the two novels. prompting an immediate rebuttal from du Maurier in a letter to the editor.

Though there were repercussions in Brazil, Nabuco did not consider suing the English publishers. When the Alfred Hitchcock film Rebecca was released in Brazil, United Artists' lawyers approached her to sign a term (with financial compensation) agreeing that there had been "coincidence", but Nabuco refused.

This information, declared by Carolina herself in her memoirs, corrects a mistake by the writer Nelly Novaes Coelho, who states, in her Dicionário Crítico de Escritoras Brasileiras (1711–2001), that Carolina would have sued the English writer for plagiarism.

University of Pennsylvania's Nina Auerbach, tells, in her work Daphne du Maurier, Haunted Heiress, that Nabuco had written A Sucessora in 1934, sending the translation to an editor in England, who was the same as the English novelist. Du Maurier would have been one of the readers of this translation and, in 1937, she would start Rebecca, published a year later, adapted on stage in 1939 and on screen in 1940.

A Sucessora was adapted as a telenovela, in 1978, written by Manoel Carlos and aired on TV Globo.

Death
Carolina died on August 18, 1981, in the city of Rio de Janeiro, at 91, due to a cardiac arrest.

Works 
 A Vida de Joaquim Nabuco (1929, biography)
 A Sucessora (1934, novel)
 Chama e Cinzas (1947, novel)
 Meu Livro de Cozinha (1977, cookbook)
 O Ladrão de Guarda-Chuva e Dez Outras Histórias (short stories)
 Oito décadas (memoirs)
 Santa Catarina de Siena (biography)
 Virgílio de Melo Franco (biography)
 Retrato dos Estados Unidos à luz da sua literatura (essay)

References

Brazilian women writers
1981 deaths
Brazilian translators
Writers from Rio de Janeiro (city)
1890 births
20th-century translators